Surilie Gautam Bhatti (born 3 April 1990)  is an Indian film and television actress. She is the daughter of director Mukesh Gautam and younger sister of actress Yami Gautam. She made her television debut in 2008 with Sony India's Meet Mila De Rabba. Later she started her film career with Punjabi film Power Cut.

She married Jasraj Singh Bhatti, son of Savita Bhatti and late Indian comedian and satirist Jaspal Bhatti in November 2013 in Chandigarh. She completed her schooling from YPS Mohali and went on to graduate from SD College Chandigarh before she moved to Mumbai to live with her sister. She is a graduate in Media and Event Management from the Indian School of Media, Mumbai.

Filmography 
Television
2008 Meet Mila De Rabba

Film
 2012 Power Cut
 2021 Shava Ni Girdhari Lal
 2022 Posti

References

External links 

 

Indian film actresses
Indian television actresses
Actresses from Mumbai
Actresses in Hindi cinema
Living people
Actresses from Lucknow
1990 births